Tracy L. Boyland (born December 18, 1968) is an American politician who served in the New York City Council from the 41st district from 1998 to 2005.

References

1968 births
Living people
New York City Council members
New York (state) Democrats
African-American New York City Council members
Women New York City Council members
People from Brownsville, Brooklyn
Politicians from Brooklyn
21st-century African-American people
20th-century African-American people
20th-century African-American women
21st-century African-American women